William Charles Renshaw (3 January 1861 – 12 August 1904) was a British tennis player active during the late 19th century, who was ranked world No. 1. He won twelve Major titles during his career. A right-hander, he was known for his power and technical ability which put him ahead of competition at the time. Renshaw shared the all-time male record of seven Wimbledon singles titles with American Pete Sampras until 2017 when Roger Federer won his eighth singles title. His six consecutive singles titles (1881–86) is an all-time record. Additionally he won the doubles title five times together with his twin brother Ernest. William Renshaw was the first president of the British Lawn Tennis Association (LTA).

Career
Renshaw won a total of twelve Wimbledon titles. His record of seven singles titles, which Pete Sampras tied in 2000, was surpassed in 2017 when Roger Federer won his  eighth title. The first six were consecutive, an achievement which has been unequalled to this day. Since 1922 the reigning champions have had to play in the main draw, making such feats considerably more difficult. In the summer months he would compete in England and Ireland, while competing on the French Riviera during the winter months and practising on a private tennis court he and his brother had built at their own cost. In singles play he played his twin brother Ernest Renshaw three times (1882, 1883 and 1889) in the Wimbledon final, triumphing on all three occasions. He was unable to defend his title in 1887 because of tennis elbow, the first time this injury received public attention, and during his absence took up golf. The other five titles were in the Gentlemen's doubles, partnering with Ernest. Additionally, he and his brother dominated the sport for many years in a time when the only other Grand Slam was the U.S. Championships, and by custom players did not travel far. The rise in popularity of tennis in this period became known as the 'Renshaw Rush'. In 1888 William was elected the first president of the British Lawn Tennis Association (LTA). In 1983, William Renshaw was elected posthumously into the International Tennis Hall of Fame together with his brother.

Death
He died in Swanage, Dorset on 12 August 1904, aged 43, of epileptic convulsions. In 2020, a street in Leamington Spa was named after his brother and him, Renshaw Drive.

Grand Slam finals

Singles (7 titles, 1 runner-up)

Doubles (5 titles)

Records

All-time

See also

 List of Grand Slam men's singles champions

References

External links

 
 

1861 births
1904 deaths
19th-century English people
19th-century male tennis players
English male tennis players
Grand Slam (tennis) champions in men's singles
Grand Slam (tennis) champions in men's doubles
International Tennis Hall of Fame inductees
Sportspeople from Leamington Spa
Twin sportspeople
English twins
Wimbledon champions (pre-Open Era)
British male tennis players
Tennis people from Warwickshire